Ron Bottcher (11 May 1940 – 18 April 1991) was an American operatic baritone who was actively performing with both the New York City Opera (NYCO) and the Metropolitan Opera during the 1960s. A native of Sandpoint, Idaho, he earned music degrees from the University of Montana and the Curtis Institute of Music. He made his debut at the Santa Fe Opera in the summer of 1961, where he portrayed the roles of Leopold in Richard Strauss' Der Rosenkavalier, Marcello in Giacomo Puccini's La bohème, and the Head waiter in Paul Hindemith's Neues vom Tage. His roles at the NYCO included Escamillo in Georges Bizet's Carmen and Sharpless in Puccini's Madama Butterfly among others. He toured throughout the United States in performances with the Metropolitan Opera National Company from 1965 to 1967. At the Met he created roles in the world premieres of Samuel Barber's Antony and Cleopatra and Marvin David Levy's Mourning Becomes Electra. He died at the age of 50 at Lenox Hill Hospital in Manhattan of AIDS related illness.

References

1940 births
1991 deaths
AIDS-related deaths in New York (state)
Curtis Institute of Music alumni
University of Montana alumni
People from Sandpoint, Idaho
Singers from Idaho
American operatic baritones
20th-century American male opera singers